José Alfonso Alvarado Pérez (born 15 March 2000), also known as Plátano, is a Mexican professional footballer who plays as a forward for Liga MX club León, on loan from Monterrey.

Career statistics

Club

Honours
Monterrey
Copa MX: 2019–20
CONCACAF Champions League: 2021

Mexico U17
CONCACAF Under-17 Championship: 2017

References

External links
 
 

Footballers from Sinaloa
2000 births
People from Guasave
Living people
Association football forwards
C.F. Monterrey players
Liga MX players
Raya2 Expansión players
Mexican footballers